Alperovich is a surname. Notable people with the surname include:

Beatriz Rojkés de Alperovich (born 1956), Argentine psychopedagogue, businesswoman, and politician, wife of José
José Alperovich (born 1955), Argentine politician